Harbison Township is one of twelve townships in Dubois County, Indiana. As of the 2010 census, its population was 1,588 and it contained 690 housing units.

History
Harbison Township was named for Arthur Harbison, a pioneer settler and judge.

The Evangelische Lutherische Emanuels Kirche was listed on the National Register of Historic Places in 1990.

Geography

Unincorporated towns
 Dubois Crossroads
 Haysville
 Kellerville
 Thales
(This list is based on USGS data and may include former settlements.)

Adjacent townships
 Rutherford Township, Martin County (north)
 Lost River Township, Martin County (northeast)
 Columbia Township (east)
 Marion Township (south)
 Bainbridge Township (southwest)
 Boone Township (west)
 Reeve Township, Daviess County (northwest)

Major highways
  U.S. Route 231
  Indiana State Road 56

Cemeteries
The township contains ten cemeteries: Cavender, Chattin, Cooper, Ewing, Gwin, Harbison, Hardin, Hope, Mount Zion and Reed.

References
 
 United States Census Bureau cartographic boundary files

External links
 Indiana Township Association
 United Township Association of Indiana

Townships in Dubois County, Indiana
Jasper, Indiana micropolitan area
Townships in Indiana